Idlewild and Soak Zone, commonly known as Idlewild Park or simply Idlewild, is a children's amusement park in the Laurel Highlands near Ligonier, Pennsylvania, United States, about  east of Pittsburgh,  along US Route 30. Founded in 1878 as a campground along the Ligonier Valley Railroad by Thomas Mellon, Idlewild is the oldest amusement park in Pennsylvania and the third oldest operating amusement park in the United States behind Lake Compounce and Cedar Point. The park has won several awards, including from industry publication Amusement Today as the best children's park in the world.

The prominent Mellon family established the park in 1878, and it remained family-owned for over 100 years. It expanded greatly throughout the first half of the 20th century, adding rides including a Philadelphia Toboggan Company Rollo Coaster in 1938, one of the company's earliest. The park is home to the Ligonier Highland Games, a Scottish athletic and cultural festival that has annually drawn over 10,000 spectators. In 1983, the park was purchased by Kennywood Entertainment Company, which oversaw additional expansion, including an attraction designed and voiced by Fred Rogers based on his television show Mister Rogers' Neighborhood. Since 2008, the park, as well as others formerly under Kennywood Entertainment, have been owned by Spanish company Parques Reunidos and operated by their American subsidiary Palace Entertainment.

History

Ligonier Valley Railroad: 1878–1952 
On April 15, 1853, the Commonwealth of Pennsylvania granted a charter for a railroad to haul coal and timber between the towns of Ligonier and Latrobe. Latrobe and Ligonier Rail Road Company performed no work on the railroad for nearly twenty years and renewed their charter in 1866 and 1869. Following an additional renewal in 1871, the company changed its name to the Ligonier Valley Railroad and acquired a  stretch of land. Land grading and bridge construction for the narrow gauge line was mostly completed by 1873.

In 1875, the partially constructed railway was sold at a sheriff's sale after the Pennsylvania Railroad, the Latrobe terminus of the line, declined to assume financial responsibility. Thomas Mellon, a retired Court of Common Pleas judge from Allegheny County, purchased the Ligonier Valley Railroad at auction. Mellon had founded the T. Mellon and Sons Bank, and was invested in coal, steel, oil, glassmaking, and other railroad ventures. To attract passengers, Mellon decided to offer recreational grounds along the route.

On May 1, 1878, William Darlington, landowner and namesake of the nearby village of Darlington, responded to Mellon's request to use his land:

The depot was the smallest full-service station in the United States. Initial land development included campsites, an artificial lake for fishing and boating, picnic tables, and a large hall. The Ligonier Echo noted that on July 4, 1890, the trains to the park were so crowded that the "tops of the coaches were covered with boys."

While the initial lease with Darlington confined the park between the railroad and the north bank of the Loyalhanna Creek, permission was later granted to construct a bridge across the river, allowing expansion to the south in the mid-1880s. Three lakes—Woodland, St. Clair, and Bouquet—were dug between 1880 and 1896. In 1896, the park added a T.M. Harton Company steam carousel in the park's center. The Pittsburgh-based company was a major manufacturer of carousels and roller coasters. By the end of the 19th century, attractions at the park included a bicycle track around Lake Bouquet, a hiking trail on the lake's island, fishing in the Loyalhanna Creek, rowboating, and many walks and gardens. The park had dining halls, auditoriums, pavilions, a boathouse, an amphitheater, a bandstand, and athletic facilities.

In 1931, Judge Mellon's son Richard B. Mellon, brother of Andrew Mellon, and C. C. Macdonald acquired the park under a partnership known as the Idlewild Management Company. The first season under the financial support of Mellon and the management of Macdonald and his family brought electricity to the park, allowing for later operating hours and electric-powered rides, including a three-row Philadelphia Toboggan Company carousel. The park also debuted a den of black bears that year. The bears were across the path from a cage of monkeys, who escaped in 1932. Park management offered a reward of $3 each ($ each in ) for the return of the seven monkeys, believing that they had been set loose. R. Z. Macdonald later said that his father, C. C., was always amused and pleased with the escape's publicity, though he never formally accused his father.

The Macdonalds sought to maintain the park's natural beauty, planting 10,000 shrubs in the first year and thousands of trees during the 1930s. In the first few years, the park added a circle swing, a Whip, a miniature railroad, and in 1938, the Philadelphia Toboggan Company Rollo Coaster. World War II and the resulting rationing forced the park to close in 1943. Upon reopening in 1946, the park added the Caterpillar and a small showboat that sailed in Lake Bouquet.

Macdonald family: 1952–1983 
The Macdonald family obtained complete ownership of the park in 1951. After leaving Idlewild, the Mellon family also abandoned the Ligonier Valley Railroad, declining after closing area coal mines and decreasing passenger traffic. The railroad ceased operations in 1952. Although the park originally depended on the railroad, the railroad's closing did not affect the park. In 1913, the Lincoln Highway had been established as the first cross-country autoroute, stretching from Times Square, New York City, to Lincoln Park, San Francisco. It passed directly by Idlewild on what is now U.S. Route 30. As automobile traffic to the park increased, several parking lots and a Gulf Oil gas station, a Mellon company, were added in the 1930s.

Under the Macdonalds, the park continued to expand. Kiddieland was constructed between 1954 and 1956 and featured many smaller versions of rides meant for children. Some of the rides included miniature boats, a Ferris wheel, doodlebug, and pony rides.

Clinton "Jack" Macdonald became president of the park in 1957. In 1959, Macdonald and Lewis Davidson, a bagpipe director at the Carnegie Institute of Technology, started the Ligonier Highland Games, a Scottish highland games event held at the park. During the same year he assumed control of the park, Macdonald was appointed the first commissioner of the Scottish Clan Donald for Pennsylvania. The games, held annually in early September after the park had closed for the summer, became one of the country's largest and most highly regarded Scottish athletic and cultural competitions. Jack Macdonald said of the Games: "We're not interested in becoming one of the biggest Games. We just want to be one of the nicest."

The park sustained heavy damage when the remnants of Hurricane Agnes dropped  of rain on the area in 24 hours in June 1972. Lake St. Clair and Lake Bouquet, merging in the resulting flood, caused significant damage to the boathouse. The flood lifted and twisted the park's Loyalhanna Limited Railroad, which required extensive repairs.

Kennywood era: 1983–2007 
On January 27, 1983, Kennywood Park Corporation of West Mifflin, Pennsylvania, near Pittsburgh, bought the park from the Macdonald family for a reported price of $1.8 million. Ironically, both Kennywood and Idlewild were founded as amusement parks by the Mellon family. During the first winter, several changes occurred. Jumpin' Jungle, a children's play area, was added. Story Book Forest was no longer run as a separate operation and was merged with the rest of the park. What had been Historic Village was relocated and renamed.

As the waterpark's popularity increased, the H20hhh Zone was added in 1985. In 1989, the park expanded across the Loyalhanna Creek by adding a trolley ride based on Mister Rogers' Neighborhood, a popular children's television show. The ride was designed and voiced by children's entertainer Fred Rogers, a native of Latrobe. The area was expanded the following year to include Raccoon Lagoon, an area for children. A Ferris wheel, Tilt-A-Whirl, and a water raft ride were added by the end of the 1980s, along with games, new food stands, and restaurants.

The 1990s brought the addition of the Wild Mouse, the only Wild Mouse roller coaster designed by Dutch company Vekoma. The roller coaster was built in 1985 and had previously operated at Wiener Prater in Austria and Alton Towers in England, before opening at Idlewild in 1993. Kennywood continued the Macdonald tradition of offering large-scale entertainment, presenting circuses, lumberjack and acrobatics shows, and stage performances at the new Hillside Theater. A large picnic area with several log pavilions and game fields was added in 1999. In the early years of the 21st century, additions to the waterpark doubled its size and led to a new name, Idlewild and Soak Zone.

Palace Entertainment: since 2008 
Kennywood Entertainment, itself an operator of a family-owned park, had acquired other family-owned and operated parks after it purchased Idlewild in 1983. Kennywood's owners rejected offers by larger companies to purchase the group, such as in 1997 by Premier Parks, which acquired the Six Flags franchise a year later. Kennywood refused the Premier offer and others because the new owners would make too many changes to the existing parks. However, on December 11, 2007, Kennywood Entertainment announced that it would sell its parks to the Madrid-based amusement company, Parques Reunidos. The fourth- and fifth-generation family ownership of Kennywood ensured that with the transaction all of the company's parks would experience few changes and that day-to-day park operations would remain local.

In December 2009, Idlewild announced that the Royal Hanneford Circus would perform at the park during the 2010 season, for the first time since 1997. For the 2011 season, the park announced that they would add a $2 million wave pool, replacing their swimming pool that had been built in 1931. The project will be the largest capital improvement undertaken by the park. Before the 2013 season, Idlewild removed its 1947 Caterpillar ride and closed the Dizzy Lizzy's Saloon Haunted Swing attraction, which is currently standing but not operating.

During the interim time between the 2013 and 2014 seasons, it was announced that the park had permanently closed its popular attraction, Mister Rogers' Neighborhood of Make-Believe. The attraction was re-themed, in coordination with The Fred Rogers Company to Daniel Tiger's Neighborhood, the much more relevant and popular spin-off of the classic children's program Mister Rogers' Neighborhood. The re-themed attraction opened for the 2015 season.

On August 11, 2016, a three-year-old boy was thrown from the Rollo Coaster and suffered serious injuries. The ride was closed pending an investigation and remained closed the remainder of the season, and all of the 2017 season. A subsequent report from the Pennsylvania Department of Agriculture, Division of Rides and Amusements listed several requirements for the ride to be reopened, and in 2018 Idlewild procured a new train for the Rollo Coaster, which included seat belts and ratcheting lap bars.

Following the 2017 season, Idlewild removed its 1938 Whip attraction, which had been closed for at least the entire 2017 season due to flood damage. The ride's cars can be seen sitting in the overflow parking lot west of the park. On November 3, 2020, Idlewild announced that it would be removing the Ferris wheel in Olde Idlewild, the Rainbow Wheel kiddie Ferris wheel in Raccoon Lagoon, and the Bubbling Springs ball pit in Jumpin' Jungle for the 2021 season.

Location 
The park is situated alongside U.S. Route 30, also historically known in Pennsylvania as the Lincoln Highway, the first U.S. transcontinental highway. The region surrounding the park is the Laurel Highlands, and the park sits in the foothills of the Laurel Ridge.

On November 12, 1758, volunteers led by George Washington marched from Ligonier to aid George Mercer and his troops. At night in heavy fog, the two units mistook one another for the enemy and exchanged fire. Thirteen soldiers and one lieutenant were killed. Realizing the mistake, Washington ran amongst both groups, shouting and raising the men's rifles. Washington later wrote of the incident that he had never felt in more danger in his life. Though the location had never been entirely verified, in Images of America: Idlewild, author Jeffrey S. Croushore acknowledges the opinion that the event took place in a section of Idlewild that was previously a wooded area known as the Woodlands.

Areas

Olde Idlewild 

Olde Idlewild is centered on the park's Philadelphia Toboggan Company Carrousel, (PTC #83) built in 1930 and brought to Idlewild in 1931. The Carousel's music is provided by two band organs: an Artizan Style D (fitted with a Wurlitzer #125 roll frame as Wurlitzer rolls are more common than Artizan rolls), which is nicknamed "The Wurlitzan" and a Wurlitzer Caliola. Olde Idlewild contains many of the park's traditional amusement rides. On the parking lot side of the Merry-Go-Round is the wooden Rollo Coaster, built by Philadelphia Toboggan in 1938 with lumber from the park, using a sawmill built nearby specifically for the project. The American Coaster Enthusiasts named the Rollo Coaster a "Classic Coaster," though this designation was rescinded after the installation of the ride's new trains in 2018. Sitting in the trees adjacent to the Loyalhanna Creek is the Wild Mouse, added in 1993. The Wild Mouse was built by Vekoma and operated at Alton Towers in Staffordshire, England, before being moved to Idlewild in 1993. The Scrambler, the Flying Aces, and the Tilt-A-Whirl also surround the Merry-Go-Round.

Another group of rides in Olde Idlewild is located around the park's Skooters, added in 1931. Surrounding the Skooters is the Balloon Race, Paratrooper, and Spider. Below the Paratrooper on the north bank of the is the Super Round Up.

Olde Idlewild contained a Caterpillar ride until 2013. Built in 1947, Idlewild's model was one of three similar rides still in operation in North America, one of two featuring a working canopy that covers the riders, and the only one that still utilized an undercarriage fan. The park announced that the ride was removed to be refurbished and would return in the future. However, as of 2021, there has been no further word from the park regarding the Caterpillar. Some of the older rides at the park were the Circle Swing which sat where the Super Round-Up sits today; this was a trio of stainless steel rocket ship gondolas that, when powered, swung over the Loyalhanna giving the illusion you were about to fly into the trees. Some other rides include the Trabant which sat where the Spider sits today,  and the Crazy Dazy which sat where the Scrambler sits today. The Paratrooper used to sit where Flying Aces sits today, this spot was also home to the Trinado,  a Huss manufactured ride that contained three arms each containing three gondolas and swung riders out and in like an elevated scrambler. The Tilt-A-Whirl used to sit adjacent to the Skooters and Whip.

Hootin' Holler 
In 1976, the Historic Village was built to commemorate the US bicentennial. Modeled after a typical 19th century Western town, the area included a general store, blacksmith and wood shops, sheriff's office, and jail, newspaper office, saloon and restaurant.

In 1984, the Historic Village was relocated from near the gates to the center of the park and renamed Hootin' Holler. The area contains Confusion Hill, a themed walkthrough tour with optical illusions. The park's  narrow gauge Loyalhanna Limited Railroad attraction crosses the Loyalhanna Creek to Raccoon Lagoon and back. The area's newest rides are the Howler, a spinning ride modeled like a tornado, and Paul Bunyan's Loggin' Toboggan, a log flume ride.

Soak Zone 

The location of the Soak Zone was originally an island known as Flower Island until part of the surrounding lake was filled in. Under previous names, it was called the H20hhh Zone and later Dr. Hydro's Soak Zone. The area originally consisted of just the pool and bathhouse until slides were first added in 1985. A raft ride, Rafter's Run, was added the next year. The water park has since been expanded to include body slides, inner-tube slides, a slide with foam mats, and many features for children, including a small pool and Captain Kidd's Adventure Galley, a play area added in 2006. The swimming pool was replaced by a heated wave pool in 2011. The addition was the park's single-largest capital improvement. For the 2013 season the park added a lazy river and an expanded beach area.

Jumpin' Jungle 
Added in 1983, Jumpin' Jungle is an interactive play area for both children and adults. The area includes attractions such as slides, climbing nets, and a suspension bridge. Added in 2008, Bigfoot's Mudslide gets its name from Westmoreland County's reputation for the most sightings in Pennsylvania of Bigfoot, an alleged ape-like creature said to inhabit remote forests.

Raccoon Lagoon 

The park's kiddieland area, Raccoon Lagoon, was added in 1989 after originally opening in a different location in 1954. The  area devoted to children-oriented rides is one of the largest in the United States. Also in Raccoon Lagoon was Mister Rogers' Neighborhood of Make-Believe. Built in 1989, the  narrow gauge trolley ride was designed specifically for Idlewild by local native Fred Rogers and is based on his popular children's television show. Before the 2014 season, it was announced that the ride would be re-themed in coordination with Fred Rogers Productions to their modern children's show, Daniel Tiger's Neighborhood (2012-), based on the original series. The redone attraction, now called the Daniel Tiger's Neighborhood Trolley Ride, reopened in 2015.

Story Book Forest 
Arthur Jennings, who portrayed the clown "Happy Dayze" in the park during the 1950s, was an accomplished engineer who approached park management about creating Story Book Forest, a theme park based on "emotion rather than motion." Jennings did much of the work himself, including life-sized models of fairy tales. The park, originally separate from Idlewild, opened in 1956. Story Book Forest featured many attractions such as a pirate ship, a castle, and many live storybook characters. The entrance to the Forest is a giant storybook that reads, "Here is the Land of Once Upon a Time ... Step through the pages of this big Story Book ... and visit the people and places every child knows ... and Loves. Here dreams are real ... and so are your Story Book friends." Now incorporated with the rest of the park, Story Book Forest celebrated its 50th anniversary in 2006.

Ligonier Highland Games 
The Ligonier Highland Games is a highland games event in early September. The events primarily occur at Idlewild, while some events also occur nearby Greensburg. Competitions include heavy athletics such as the caber toss, stone put, and weight and hammer throw.  Other competitions in music include highland dancing, solo and band piping, drumming, Scottish fiddling, and Scottish harp. Vendors sell related items such as authentic tartans, bagpipes, and jewellery. While initially attracting crowds of 1,200, the festival now records average attendances near 10,000.

Rides and Attractions

Roller coasters

Rides

Recognition 
Idlewild and Soak Zone is the oldest operating amusement park in Pennsylvania, third oldest in the United States, and twelfth oldest in the world. The park has been recognized by trade magazine Amusement Today with the "Golden Ticket" award for best children's park in the world every year since 2010, through to 2018. The park previously received Golden Tickets for the fifth-best children's area in 2006 and 2007 and second-best children's park for the sixth consecutive year in 2009. The National Amusement Park Historical Association recognized Idlewild as the best park for families in 2010, 2011, and 2012, having previously named it the fourth-best park in 2005, second in 2006, fourth again in 2007 and 2008, and third in 2009. The park was once named "America's Most Beautiful Theme Park".

References

Works cited

External links 
 
 
  

Buildings and structures in Westmoreland County, Pennsylvania
Palace Entertainment
1878 establishments in Pennsylvania
Tourist attractions in Westmoreland County, Pennsylvania
Amusement parks in Pennsylvania